Saint Bernulf or San Bernulfo or St Bernulphe (9th century AD) was Bishop of Asti (now Italy).  Traditionally, the Bishop was one of several (unnamed) martyrs put to death by Muslim raiders in the early 9th century.

Their remains were later transferred the church at Mondovì, where Bernulf was venerated as patron saint of the town.  That honor was later taken by the current patron saint, Saint Ubaldo.

His feast day is 24 March.

References 
 Sanctoral des RP Bénédictins, éditions Letouzey & Ané (1939)
 http://nominis.cef.fr/contenus/saint/6288/Saint-Bernulf.html

Bishops of Asti
9th-century Christian saints
Medieval Italian saints
Christian saints killed by Muslims